The second season of the Greek and Cypriot reality talent show The Voice of Greece premiered on February 15, 2015 on ANT1. Based on the reality singing competition The Voice of Holland, the series was created by Dutch television producer John de Mol. It is part of an international series.

On July 16, 2014, it was confirmed that both the presenters and the coaches of the previous season would return. The winner receives a record deal with Minos EMI and a Peugeot 108 as part of his prizes.

Teams
Each coach of the season had, after the blind auditions, sixteen acts in his team. During the battles each coach lost half of his acts. During the live shows, the coaches were losing two (first and second live) or one act (third to fifth live) until the final live where each coach had one act.
Color key

Blind auditions 
The blind auditions took place in the Kapa Studios in Spata, Attica. Each coach had the length of the artists' performance to decide if they wanted that artist on their team. If two or more coaches have wanted the same artist, then the artist chose their coach. If only one wanted the artist, then the artist was defaulted in his team. Once the coaches picked their team, they pitted them against each other in the Battles.

Color key

Episode 1 (February 15) 
The first blind audition episode was broadcast on February 15, 2015.

Episode 2 (February 22) 
The second blind audition episode was broadcast on February 22, 2015.

Episode 3 (March 1) 
The third blind audition episode was broadcast on March 1, 2015.

Episode 4 (March 8) 
The fourth blind audition episode was broadcast on March 8, 2015.

Episode 5 (March 15) 
The fifth blind audition episode was broadcast on March 15, 2015.

Episode 6 (March 22) 
The sixth blind audition episode was broadcast on March 22, 2015.

Episode 7 (March 29) 
The seventh blind audition episode was broadcast on March 27, 2015.

Episode 8 (April 5) 
The eighth blind audition episode was broadcast on April 5, 2015.

The Battles 
The Battles take place in the Kapa Studios in Spata, Attica. Two artists from each team compete against by singing the same song. The coach of the two acts decides which one will go through and which one will be eliminated meaning that eight acts from each team will get through the live shows. The battle advisors for these episodes are: Christos Dantis working with Antonis Remos, Giannis Vardis working with Despina Vandi, Giorgos Papadopoulos working with Melina Aslanidou and Giannis Giokarinis working with Michalis Kouinelis.

The Battles episodes started airing on Sunday April 12, 2014 and will end on SundayMay 3, 2014 after four episodes with eight battles taking place in each one.

Color key

Episode 1 (April 12) 
The first battle round episode was broadcast on April 12, 2015.

Episode 2 (April 19) 
The second battle round episode was broadcast on April 19, 2015.

Episode 3 (April 26) 
The third battle round episode was broadcast on April 26, 2015.

Episode 4 (May 3) 
The fourth battle round episode was broadcast on May 3, 2015.

Live shows

Results summary 
Color key
Artist's info

Result details

Live show details
The live shows took place in the Kapa Studios in Spata, Attica. Each coach has eight acts; during the first live show four from each team performed but only two of them advanced to the third live show. The same process goes on to the second with sixteen acts from both lives making it to the third live show. From the third live and on, each coach loses one act until each coach has one act in the final live.

Color key

Week 1 (May 17) 
The first live show aired on May 17, 2015 – with five acts from each team performing except Team Vandi which had four because a contestant withdrew. Two acts per team were saved, one by the public and one from his/her coach.
 Group performance: The Voice of Greece coaches – "Anatreptika""

Week 2 (May 24) 
The second live show aired on May 25, 2015 – with five acts from each team performing. Two acts per team were saved, one by the public and one from his/her coach.

Week 3 (May 31) 
The live show aired on May 31, 2015 – with four acts from each team performing. Three acts per team were saved, two by the public and one from his/her coach.

Week 4 (June 7) 
The live show aired on June 7, 2015 – with three acts from each team performing. Two acts per team were saved, one by the public and one from his/her coach.
 Group performances: Team Stavento ("Se'sena Kataligo"), Team Vandi ("Mavro Helidoni/Do sta Lianochortaroudia"), Team Remos ("Meine"), Team Aslanidou ("Ti Sou'kana kai Pineis")

Week 5: Semi-final (June 14) 
The live show aired on June 14, 2015 – with two acts from each team performing. One act per team was sent through the final by a mixed voting of the team's coach and public. Each artist performed two songs: a solo number and a duet with a guest. The four finalists performed a preview of their own songs after the results.
 Musical guests: Tamta ("Unloved"), Lakis Papadopoulos ("Koursaros"), Vegas ("Apopse"), Nikos Ziogalas ("Perase i Mpora"), Christos Dantis ("Ritores Kompinadoroi"), Stamatis Gonidis ("Apagoreuetai"), Eleni Tsaligopoulou ("Trava re Magka"), Giannis Vardis ("Pente Lepta")

Week 6: Final (June 21) 
The final live show aired on June 21, 2015 – with one artist from each team performing. Each artist performed three songs: a solo number, a duet with their coach and the song that was performed by the artist in the blind auditions.
 Group performance: The Voice of Greece previous contestants - "Counting Stars"

Performances by guests/coaches

Ratings

References

External links
 

Season 2
Voice of Greece